La Sierpe is a municipality and town in the Sancti Spíritus Province of Cuba. It is located in the south-eastern part of the province,  from Sancti Spiritus, the provincial capital.

Geography
It borders the Gulf of Ana Maria of the Caribbean Sea to the south and the province of Ciego de Ávila to the east.

It is also located near the geographic center of the country.

Demographics
In 2004, the municipality of La Sierpe had a population of 16,937.

See also
Municipalities of Cuba
List of cities in Cuba

References

External links

Populated places in Sancti Spíritus Province